Chernigivske or Chernihivske is a brand of lager beer produced in Ukraine. It originates from the Ukrainian city of Chernihiv. The beer was brewed for the first time as a gift to celebrate the 1,300th anniversary of the city in 1988. 

Chernigivske beer is produced in three breweries in Ukraine, located in Chernihiv, Kharkiv and Mykolaiv. The breweries are currently owned by SUN InBev Ukraine, a subsidiary of AB InBev.

In April 2022, AB InBev announced that it would be brewing Chernigivske in several countries, including the United States, the United Kingdom, the Netherlands, Canada, Belgium  and Germany, with profits going towards supporting humanitarian relief efforts in Ukraine following the 2022 Russian invasion.

Types
 Light (Світле): 4.8% ABV
 Premium (Преміум): 5.6% ABV
 Strong (Міцне): 7.5% ABV
 Dark (Темне): 6.0% ABV
 White (Біле): 5.0% ABV- First unfiltered beer on the Ukrainian market
 White Night (Біла Нiч): 5.0% ABV
 White Honey (Білий Мед): 5.0% ABV
 Purple (Багряне): 5.2% ABV

Sponsorship

In different periods of time Chernigivske:

supported the Olympic National Team of Ukraine,
was the official sponsor of the Football Championship of Ukraine,
was the official sponsor of National Football Team of Ukraine,
was the national partner of the Eurovision Song Contest,
supported different social initiatives and programs.

See also
 Beer in Ukraine

References

External links
 

Companies based in Chernihiv
Beer in Ukraine
Ukrainian brands